Brian Shannon, CMT (DOB November 16, 1967) is an American author, equity trader, technical analyst, author of the beginner's trading book Technical Analysis Using Multiple Timeframes, and best-seller book "Maximum Trading Gains with Anchored VWAP," (Jan 2023), and founder of Alphatrends.net, a stock trading education company.

Background
Shannon was born in Denver, Colorado, though his parents lived in Aurora, Colorado at the time. They later moved to Andover, Massachusetts where he grew up.

Shannon graduated from Austin Preparatory School in 1986 and went on to receive a Bachelor of Arts in Business Management from Merrimack College in 1991.

Shannon has two sons, Matthew and Ryan, and currently resides in Denver, CO.

Career
Shannon watched Louis Rukeyser on Wall $treet Week with his physician father as a child. He placed his first trade with money earned as a caddie and his newspaper route when he was 13 years old. He was living in Boston and car thefts were common so he bought shares of LoJack at $US 5.00 and watched the stock double over the next three months.

After college, Shannon worked for a penny stock company called Thomas James for a couple of months before taking a position as a stockbroker with Lehman Brothers in Boston, MA where he was first exposed to technical analysis. He moved to Tucker Anthony in 1992 and worked as a stockbroker for Dain Bosworth from 1994 to 1998 Shannon. He spent a short period as a trader for Generic Trading, LLC in New York, NY before moving to Denver, CO to run Landmark Securities as a Series 24 Manager. From 1999 to 2006, Shannon was Lead Trader and the Director of Research at MarketWise Securities, where he began educating and mentoring people about technical analysis and trading techniques.

In 2006, Shannon started his financial education blog Alphatrends. The blog was called the "YouTube of technical analysis" by the editor of Technical Analysis of Stocks & Commodities. As of 2010, over 400 people were subscribed to Shannon's trading service.

In 2008, Shannon published his book Technical Analysis Using Multiple Timeframes The book was written to assist traders new to technical analysis with intermediate level material such as market structure and trend alignment. Charles E. Kirk of The Kirk Report praised the book for explaining "relatively complex ideas" in a "straightforward manner". The Market Technicians Association review of the book called it "readable and valuable" for both novices and experienced traders. 

In 2013, Shannon passed the Chartered Market Technician (CMT) exam.

References

External links
alphatrends.net – Shannon's website
AlphaTrends YouTube – Educational videos by Shannon

American business writers
American financial analysts
American stock traders
Living people
Merrimack College alumni
People from Aurora, Colorado
Technical analysts
1967 births